Toner William Hosking (9 May 1891 – 12 May 1963) was an Australian rules footballer who played with South Melbourne in the Victorian Football League (VFL).

Family
The son of Peter Joseph Murphy (1861–1894) and Emily Amelia (1869–1962), née Scarlett, Toner William Murphy was born at Deep Lead Railway Station just north of Stawell on 9 May 1891. After his father's death in 1894, his mother married Benjamin Edward Hosking and Toner subsequently took the Hosking name.

In 1917, Toner Hosking married Alice Annette Andrew (1893–1938) and they subsequently had three sons.

Notes

External links 

1891 births
1963 deaths
Australian rules footballers from Victoria (Australia)
Sydney Swans players
People from Stawell, Victoria